This is a list of the stained glass works of Louis Davis (1860–1941).

Of Davis' legacy, it was said:
"His colour and design satisfy the sense of beauty, and the actual craftsmanship will always be a wonder to those who understand the art of glass-making."

List of stained glass works

List of other forms of works
 For All Saints Church in West Lavington, Wiltshire , Davis executed a painting entitled "Virgin and Child" in 1910.
 In 1907, Davis also produced a portfolio of ten drawings, mostly cartoons for glasswork . These include a Study of the head of Beryl;  Summer and hermonths, a study prepared for Welbeck Abbey;  Virgin and child with butterflies;  The Angel of the Christmas tree and Angel of the Rose, three drawings made for decoration in the oratory of Adeline, Duchess of Bedford;  a Study of Drapery – The dream of St Martin;  The Island of the Hart, a drawing for decoration in the Marquis of Londonderry's private chapel at Wynyard Park, County Durham;  Child Angel with Dove, a study for a window at St Patrick's Cathedral, Dublin;  The dream of St Anselm and Weeping Angel, the latter designed for a painting on the decorated panels above the back of the altar, at the former church of All Hallows in Southwark.
 In 1952, Edith Davis, Louis' wife, presented a panel featuring St Nicholas to Abingdon Chapel, this as a memorial to her late husband.   The panel is the artist's copy of his panel, coloured in a cold dark blue, but relieved by some gold, and brown, appropriately called the North Wind.  It came from Davis's series of great choir windows in the Lady Chapel of Dunblane Abbey illustrating the Benedicite. The Abingdon panel is likely to have been Davis's copy of the Dunblane window which he made for the 1924 British Empire Exhibition at Wembley.  To remember this local artist, Abingdon School currently awards Louis Davis art exhibitions and scholarships.
 In Leamington Spa Art Gallery and Museum is a Davis watercolour "Study for an Altarpiece."
 At Holyrood House there is a stained glass panel by Davis depicting St Margaret of Scotland, which is displayed in the newly restored oak-panelled oratory or prayer niche of Mary, Queen of Scots. In Mary's time, a window in this recess looked down directly onto the west entrance of Holyrood Abbey Church. The original ceiling panel of this small recess is decorated with the Cross of St Andrew encircled by a Royal Crown. In Davis' design,  St Margaret (c.1046–93) stands in a colourful, flower-filled meadow, with her husband, Malcolm III, behind her. She holds a scroll bearing a plan of Dunfermline Abbey, where their marriage took place in 1070. It was St Margaret's son, David I, who founded the Abbey at Holyrood in 1128. This panel of St Margaret had been presented by the Duke of Atholl to King George V in 1927, in gratitude for the King's support in establishing the Scottish National War Memorial at Edinburgh Castle in 1927.
 In the Stained Glass Museum at Ely is a design for a three light stained glass window for St Matthew's Church, Surbiton. The centre light shows the Virgin Mary and  the Jesus Child. The outer lights shows angels, one holds a spear pointed at the large serpent which appears at the bottom of the three lights. This was executed in around 1920.
 At St John the Baptist's Chapel in Matlock Bath , there is a Davis stained glass window at the east end. The chapel was built in 1897 for Mrs Louisa Sophia Harris and was designed by Guy Dawber .  Since being declared redundant, in 2002 the chapel was taken into the care of the charity, the Friends of Friendless Churches.
 In Stanmore Hall, near Harrow, William Knox D'Arcy (1849–1917), a great supporter of the Arts and Crafts movement, had some stained glass designed by Davis.

Gallery

References

Davis, Louis